Monk Fryston is a small village and civil parish in the Selby district of North Yorkshire, England.

The village was historically part of the West Riding of Yorkshire until 1974.

History and overview
The Dictionary of British Place Names notes Monk Fryston as "Fristun" (c. 1030) and "Munechesfryston" (1166). The name derives from the Old English for "farmstead of the frisians", with prefix 'Monk' relating to it being an 11th-century possession of Selby Abbey. According to a personal FreeUK web page, the name of the village originates from Monk's Free Stone as all of the stone used to build Selby Abbey was obtained from a quarry in the centre of the village across the road from the old school building. The quarry was filled in for a housing development located next to the new school building, built on the old school field in 1998–99. The old school building has since been converted to housing.

The village is very closely linked to Hillam, although both villages maintain separate parish councils.

According to the 2011 UK census the population of Monk Fryston parish was 1,008 and the number of households was 406.

The A63 road, Leeds to Selby, runs through the village.

Primary education needs are served by Monk Fryston Church of England Primary School.

The parish church is St Wilfrid's Monk Fryston (Church of England).

The village has one public house, the Crown Inn, which dates back to the 1600s, and a hotel, the Monk Fryston Hall Hotel which dates back to the 12th century.

The National Heritage List for England, compiled by English Heritage, holds 15 listed buildings for Monk Fryston.  The list includes the Grade I St Wilfrid's Church, the Grade II* Monk Fryston Hall and two Grade II milestones.
The York and North Midland Railway passes to the west of Monk Fryston. An old station platform still exists next to the railway just down from Milford sidings. The spot is popular with railway enthusiasts.

Sports

Monk Fryston is involved in village sports, including football and cricket, where home matches are held at Stocking Lane.

Governance
Monk Fryston is part of the Monk Fryston and South Milford electoral ward.  This ward had a total population taken at the 2011 census of 4,096.

References

External links

  Monk Fryston Church of England Primary School
 The Ancient Parish of Monk Fryston
  Hillam News local newspaper
  St Wilfrid's, Monk Fryston
 Film of Monk Fryston in 1950s
 Having fun raising money for the church roof fund

Civil parishes in North Yorkshire
Selby District
Villages in North Yorkshire